The Screen Actors Guild Award for Outstanding Performance by a Female Actor in a Drama Series is an award given by the Screen Actors Guild to honor the finest acting achievements in Dramatic Television.

Winners and nominees

1990s

2000s

2010s

2020s

Superlatives

Trivia

Multiple winners
4 wins
 Julianna Margulies

3 wins
 Gillian Anderson
 Edie Falco

2 wins
 Viola Davis
 Claire Foy
 Allison Janney
 Sandra Oh

Multiple nominees

9 nominations
 Julianna Margulies

7 nominations
 Gillian Anderson
 Edie Falco
 Kyra Sedgwick

6 nominations
 Mariska Hargitay
 Elisabeth Moss

5 nominations
 Allison Janney
 Christine Lahti
 Robin Wright

4 nominations
 Glenn Close
 Claire Danes
 Maggie Smith

3 nominations
 Patricia Arquette
 Lorraine Bracco
 Kim Delaney
 Sally Field
 Julia Garner
 Holly Hunter
 Jessica Lange
 Laura Linney

2 nominations
 Jennifer Aniston
 Millie Bobby Brown
 Stockard Channing
 Olivia Colman
 Tyne Daly
 Viola Davis
 Claire Foy
 Jennifer Garner
 Lauren Graham
 Sandra Oh
 Annie Potts
 Della Reese
 Jane Seymour
 Sela Ward

See also
 Golden Globe Award for Best Actress – Television Series Drama
 Primetime Emmy Award for Outstanding Lead Actress in a Drama Series
 Primetime Emmy Award for Outstanding Supporting Actress in a Drama Series

External links
 SAG Awards official site

Female Actor Drama Series
 
Television awards for Best Actress